Mother Night is a 1962 novel by Kurt Vonnegut

Mother Night may also refer to:

 Mother Night (film), a 1996 U.S. romantic war drama film, based on the Kurt Vonnegut novel
 'Mother Night' (comics), a Marvel Comics character

See also

 Mōdraniht, an Anglo-Saxon pagan festival
 
 Night Mother (disambiguation)
 Mother (disambiguation)
 Night (disambiguation)